The River Thurso has Loch Rumsdale in Caithness as its source, about 26 kilometres south and 14 kilometres west of the burgh of Thurso, Caithness, and about 2 kilometres south of the railway line linking the burghs of Thurso and Wick with Inverness. At its source and until it reaches Loch More the river is known also as Strathmore Water. Caithness is in the Highland area of Scotland.

From Loch Rumsdale the river flows generally east/southeast across about 4 kilometres until it is joined by Glutt Water, and then generally northeast across about 7 kilometres until it enters the southern end of Loch More. On the loch's eastern side, towards its northern end, the river flows almost immediately into the western end of Loch Beg. Then from Loch Beg's eastern end the river flows east/northeast across about 6 kilometres until it is joined by Little River.

From Little River the River Thurso flows generally northward across about 19 kilometres until it reaches its mouth in Thurso Bay and the Atlantic Ocean. On its way it passes through the village of Halkirk, about 9 kilometres south of the burgh of Thurso, and through the burgh itself, which fronts the bay.

The river is bridged twice by railways, three times by highways and twice by footways (the third footbridge was recently destroyed by the river during severe flooding Footbridge replaced).

About 4 kilometres south of Thurso burgh the river is bridged by the rail link between the burghs of Wick and Thurso. About 6 kilometres further south it is bridged by the rail link connecting both burghs with Inverness.

The highways cross the river in the burgh of Thurso, in Halkirk, and at Westerdale, which is about 16 kilometres south of the burgh.

The three footway crossings were within the burgh of Thurso.

References

Thurso Cemetery Footbridge To Be Replaced

Thurso
Thurso
Thurso